Kyle Williams may refer to:
Kyle Williams (defensive tackle) (born 1983), American football defensive tackle
Kyle Williams (offensive tackle) (born 1984), American football  offensive tackle
 Kyle Williams (footballer) (born 1987), association football player
 Kyle Williams (wide receiver) (born 1988), American football wide receiver
Kyle Williams, character in Legion (2010 film)

See also
	
 Kylie Williams (disambiguation)